Crusader is the sixth studio album by English heavy metal band Saxon, released in February 1984 by Carrere Records.

Songs
Of the title of the album and the title track, bassist Steve Dawson has said that "In England, there's a paper called the Daily Express, and on the logo at the top of the paper, there's a crusader, and there was a car made by Ford called a Cortina Crusader. That's what started it off. We just liked the name "Crusader". We didn't have any connotations of what it meant as far as history goes, but we just liked the name "Crusader", so we just wrote the lyrics to fit the title, really."

Reception

Eduardo Rivadavia of AllMusic said that although by the time they released the album, "the band had obviously stopped leading the New Wave of British Heavy Metal with its aggressive, blue-collar biker anthems", the album "as a whole offers a slight improvement over the previous year's Power & the Glory from an overall songwriting perspective". Canadian journalist Martin Popoff considered Saxon's turn to "a low-cal, kinder, gentler metal... a well-conceived experiment" and denied those who called Crusader "a failure" and "a bald-faced commercial maneuver", finding the album "refreshing if more than occasionally flawed."

The album reached No. 1 in the metal charts in Sweden, France and Germany. It peaked at #18 in the UK Albums Chart. It also charted in the U.S. Billboard chart.

Track listing

Personnel
Biff Byford – vocals
Graham Oliver – guitar
Paul Quinn – guitar
Steve Dawson – bass guitar
Nigel Glockler – drums

 Production
 Kevin Beamish – producer, engineer
 Bruce Barris – engineer
 Sound City Studios, Los Angeles, California – recording location
 George Marino – mastering at Sterling Sound, New York City 
 Paul R. Gregory – artwork
Nigel Thomas – management

Charts

Album

Singles

References

Saxon (band) albums
1984 albums
Carrere Records albums
Albums produced by Kevin Beamish
Albums recorded at Sound City Studios